Joseph Banaghan (born 1961) is an Irish former hurler. At club level he played with Kilruane MacDonaghs and was also a member of the Tipperary senior hurling team.

Career

Banaghan first played hurling at juvenile and underage levels with the Kilruane MacDonaghs club. He eventually progressed onto the club's senior team and was at right wing-back on the Kilruane MacDonaghs team that won the All-Ireland Club Championship title in 1986.

At inter-county level, Banaghan never played at minor or under-21 levels. His performances at club level earned a call-up to the Tipperary senior hurling team for the 1986 Munster SHC campaign.

Honours

Kilruane MacDonaghs
All-Ireland Senior Club Hurling Championship: 1986
Munster Senior Club Hurling Championship: 1985
Tipperary Senior Hurling Championship: 1985

References

External link

 Joe Banaghan player profile

1961 births
Living people
Kilruane MacDonaghs hurlers
Tipperary inter-county hurlers